The Slovene National Benefit Society, known in Slovenian as  Slovenska narodna podporna jednota, and by its Slovene initials S.N.P.J. is an ethnic fraternal benefit and social organization for Slovene immigrants and their descendants in the United States. Founded in 1904, it is headquartered in suburban Pittsburgh, Pennsylvania, USA near Imperial.  SNPJ publishes a newspaper, Prosveta.

Formation and growth 

The SNPJ was formed in Chicago, Illinois on April 6, 1904, and held its first convention on April 9. The society was organized the result of a call in a Slovenian language newspaper for a new Slovenian benefit society. The founding twelve delegates represented nine independent Slovene groups with a total membership of 276. The organization was incorporated on June 17, 1907. The incorporation was delayed over a year because of an Illinois law which required fraternal benefit groups to have at least 500 members.   In 1905 membership had grown to over 1,500 in 27 lodges.  By only 1907 there were almost 4,300 members in 60 lodges.  In 1917 the SNPJ, with 16,700 members in 360 lodges, had become the largest Slovene fraternal benefit society in the United States.

In the late 1960s the Society had 68,000 members. In 1979 it had 56,000 members in 350 lodges in twenty states.

In 1921, the SNPJ merged with the Slovene Workmen's Benefit Society, or SDPZ, (which had previously absorbed the St. Barbara Lodge and the Slovene Labor Benefit and Pension Union).  This merger gave the SNPJ over 36,000 members in 374 lodges.   In 1941 the Slovenian Progressive Benefit Society (SSPZ) merged with the SNPJ.  The Lily Alliance merged with SNPJ in 1947.  Just over twenty years later, in 1969, the Slovene Independent Benefit Society merged with SNPJ.   Thirty-two years after that merger, in 2001, the Workingmen's Beneficial Society of Pittsburgh merged with SNPJ.

The first English speaking lodge, Pioneer Lodge 559 of Chicago, was chartered in 1925.

In 1961, all Canadian members were consolidated into a single lodge; in 1971 this lodge was transferred to the Croatian Fraternal Union.

The high point of individual memberships appears to have been in 1950, when SNPJ had 71,554 members.  The high point of lodge membership appears to have been in 1946, when SNPJ was composed of 614 active lodges. 

In 1995 the SNPJ had 47,764 members.

As of 2002 there were 42,299 members in 170 lodges.

The Society was founded on a "freethought" basis. This was because many of the founders felt that existing Slovene organizations were too closely tied to the church.

Organization 

The local chapters of the Society are called "Lodges" and the supreme authority is the "National Legislative Body", which meets quadrennially.  Between conventions the Society is run by a "National Board".  In 1979 it was headquartered in Burr Ridge, Illinois, but now appears to have its central office in Imperial, Pennsylvania. The Lodges appear to be organized into numbered regions as well as local federations.

Benefits 
Originally the Society offered a death benefit of $500 to males, with a $1 flat rate assessment. However, by the 1970s, the Society was a legal reserve fund insurance group. The Society sponsors scholarships and operates a recreation center for its members, among other activities.

Ritual 

The Society has a ritual, but is not secret about it. The ritual included initiation rites, installation ceremonies for officers, an organizational pledge and burial rites. A prospective member must promise to be faithful to the Society's constitution, defend the reputation of the lodges, and bring no harm to the organization.

See also 
S.N.P.J., Pennsylvania
KSKJ
Slovenian Americans

References

Further reading 
Sedmak, J. An Inspired Journey.  The SNPJ Story: The First One Hundred Years of the Slovene National Benefit Society. Slovene National Benefit Society, Imperial, PA. 2004 .

External links
SNPJ Homepage
Slovenian Americans
SNPJ Recreation Center, Pennsylvania
SNPJ Farm, Kirtland, Ohio

Slovene-American history
Organizations established in 1904
Ethnic fraternal orders in the United States